Bill Patton may refer to:

 Bill Patton (baseball) (1912–1986)
 Bill Patton (actor) (1894–1951)

See also 
 William Patton (disambiguation)
 Bill Patten (disambiguation)